Julio César Costemalle (born 3 May 1914, date of death unknown) was a Uruguayan water polo player. He competed at the 1936 Summer Olympics and the 1948 Summer Olympics.

References

1914 births
Year of death missing
Uruguayan male water polo players
Olympic water polo players of Uruguay
Water polo players at the 1936 Summer Olympics
Water polo players at the 1948 Summer Olympics
Sportspeople from Montevideo